USS LCI(L)-339 was an amphibious assault ship (Landing Craft Infantry – Large), commissioned in 1942 by the United States Coast Guard. She participated in the Australian Army's 9th Division's landing at Lae on 4 September 1943, where she was abandoned after being hit during a Japanese air attack.  The bomb exploded on the deck forward of the bridge, killing Lieutenant Colonel R. E. Wall, the commander of the 2/23rd Battalion and 6 others, and wounding 28. Her hulk was beached, until sometime later, when her hull was towed off the beach and cast adrift, becoming a wreck on a nearby reef.

References

1942 ships
Landing craft
Shipwrecks of Papua New Guinea
Ships sunk by Japanese aircraft
Maritime incidents in September 1943